Carlos Daniel Anastácio Henriques (born 7 July 1993) is a Portuguese footballer who plays for S.C.U. Torreense as a goalkeeper.

Club career
Born in Silves, Algarve, Henriques played for three local clubs as a youth, finishing his development at Portimonense SC. He never made more than five Segunda Liga appearances in his first six seasons as a senior, his first coming on 14 January 2012 in a 1–2 home loss against C.F. União.

Henriques played his first match in the Primeira Liga on 5 May 2018 – his sole of the campaign – on 5 May 2018, in a 3–2 away defeat to C.F. Os Belenenses. He spent the following three years in the second division, with F.C. Paços de Ferreira, S.C. Covilhã (both on loan) and C.D. Mafra.

On 5 July 2021, Henriques signed with Liga 3 side S.C.U. Torreense.

References

External links

1993 births
Living people
People from Silves, Portugal
Sportspeople from Faro District
Portuguese footballers
Association football goalkeepers
Primeira Liga players
Liga Portugal 2 players
Campeonato de Portugal (league) players
Portimonense S.C. players
F.C. Paços de Ferreira players
S.C. Covilhã players
C.D. Mafra players
S.C.U. Torreense players